IUSS may refer to:

Integrated Undersea Surveillance System
Integrated Undersea Surveillance System insignia
The International Union of Soil Sciences 
IUSS Pavia, a Higher Learning Institution in Pavia, Italy